Kać is a suburban settlement of the city of Novi Sad, Serbia. The town has a Serb ethnic majority and its population was 11,612 at the 2011 census.

Name
In Serbian, the town is known as Kać or Каћ, in Croatian as Kać, in Hungarian as Káty, and in German as Katsch.

History
It was first mentioned during the administration of the medieval Kingdom of Hungary in 1276 as in villa Hatt, while in 1332/33, it was mentioned as Mathias de Shacz. During the Habsburg rule in the 18th and 19th century, the village was part of the Military Frontier (the Šajkaš Battalion section).

Demographics

Culture and sport
Jugović is a team handball club from Kać. It competes in the Serbian First League of Handball since 1984. It was founded in 1956 under the name Mladost and changed its name to Jugović in 1960. Jugović won the EHF Challenge Cup in the 2000/2001 season.

There is a soccer team, also named Jugović, founded on 16 August 1912. It competes in the Novosadsko-Sremska zone League (4th League).

There is an Orthodox church from 1841/44 in the town and a monastery named Manastir Vaskrsenja Hristova

New neighborhoods in Kać
There are two new neighborhoods in Kać, Petrovdansko naselje and luxurious Sunčani breg.

Transport
Kać is connected to Novi Sad by the city's bus service JGSP Novi Sad. Bus lines 22 (Kać), 23 (Budisava) and 24 (Kovilj) pass through the town frequently as do other coaches to Titel, Perlez, Pančevo, Mošorin, Gardinovci and Lok.

Notable people
 Mileva Marić – physicist
 Avram Miletić – poet
 Johann Lasi – Hungarian pilot
 Arpad Sterbik – handball player
 Dragan Škrbić – handball player
 Milorad Krivokapić – handball player
 Nenad Peruničić – handball player
 Dobrivoje Marković – handball player
 Rajko Prodanović – handball player
 Jovo Bosančić – football player
 Đorđe Randelj – writer
 Voja Skrbić – Gangster

Gallery

See also
Novi Sad
List of places in Serbia
List of cities, towns and villages in Vojvodina

References

Slobodan Ćurčić, Broj stanovnika Vojvodine, Novi Sad, 1996.

External links

 Unofficial website
 Facebook page

Suburbs of Novi Sad
Places in Bačka
South Bačka District